Camilla Carstens (born 6 February 1977) is a Norwegian team handball player. She played for Fjellhammer IL, ASPTT Metz in France and the Danish club Ikast and on the Norway women's national handball team. She became European champion with the Norwegian team in 1998.

Carstens made her debut on the national team in 1998. She played 13 matches and scored 12 goals for the Norwegian national handball team between 1998 and 2000.

References

External links

1977 births
Living people
Norwegian female handball players
Norwegian expatriate sportspeople in Denmark
Norwegian expatriate sportspeople in France
Expatriate handball players